The  was an infantry division of the Imperial Japanese Army. Its call sign was the 

The 47th Division was formed 14 May 1943 in Hirosaki, simultaneously with 42nd, 43rd and 46th divisions. The nucleus for the division formation was the 67th independent infantry brigade and the headquarters of the 57th division. The 47th division was initially assigned to Northern District Army.

At 13 June 1944, a 12th detachment comprising three infantry battalions and mountain artillery battalion was separated from 47th division and sent to Luzon, where it was expanded to 58th Independent Mixed Brigade and fought in Battle of Luzon until surrender of Japan 15 August 1945.

In December 1944, the division was assigned to 43rd army and transferred to North China, where it participated in disastrous Battle of West Hunan from April 1945.
 
The 47th division have meet the surrender of Japan 15 August 1945 in Jinan and was demobilized starting from February 1946 in Qingdao with last ships landing in Sasebo, Nagasaki 17 April 1945. In the unusual turn of events, a significant fraction of the officers and soldiers joined the Chinese Communist Party and continued to fight the Kuomintang in the Chinese Civil War.

See also
 List of Japanese Infantry Divisions
 Independent Mixed Brigades (Imperial Japanese Army)

Reference and further reading

 Madej, W. Victor. Japanese Armed Forces Order of Battle, 1937-1945 [2 vols] Allentown, PA: 1981

Japanese World War II divisions
Infantry divisions of Japan
Military units and formations established in 1943
Military units and formations disestablished in 1946
1943 establishments in Japan
1946 disestablishments in Japan